Inder may refer to:

People
 Inder Bawra, an Indian music director

Places
Inder, the administrative center of Jalaid Banner, Mongolia
Inder, a locality in the Nagpur district in state of Maharashtra, India
Inder District, a district of Atyrau Region in Kazakhstan
Inder (lake), a lake in Kazakhstan

Other
Inder (company), a former Spanish manufacturer of pinball machines

See also